X Sagittarii is a variable star and candidate binary star system in the southern constellation of Sagittarius, near the western constellation boundary with Ophiuchus. It has a yellow-white hue and is visible to the naked eye with an apparent visual magnitude that fluctuates around 4.54. The star is located at a distance of approximately 950 light years from the Sun based on parallax, and is drifting closer with a radial velocity of −10 km/s. The star has an absolute magnitude of around −2.85.

This is an F-type bright giant with a stellar classification of F7II. It is a Classical Cepheid variable that ranges in apparent magnitude from 4.20 down to 4.90 with a period of 7.01283 days. Its variation in brightness is accompanied by a change in spectral classification, from G2 to F5. The amplitude of each pulsation causes the stellar radius to vary by ~9%. Analysis of the spectra suggest there are two shock waves per pulsation period, with complicated patterns appearing in the metallic lines. The star is surrounded by an optically-thin circumstellar envelope at 15–20 stellar radii, which appears as an infrared excess of 13.3%. This may be composed of amorphous carbon.

László Szabados suggested in 1990 that this might be a binary system with a period of 507 days. A detection of this projected companion was reported in 2013 using the VLTI/AMBER instrument. A subsequent optical search reported a failure to detect the companion in 2014, excluding companions brighter than a A-type main-sequence star class of A9V. The estimated mass of this object is 0.2–.

References

F-type bright giants
Classical Cepheid variables
Binary stars

Sagittarius (constellation)
CD-27 11930
Sagittarii, 03
161592
087072
6616
Sagittarii, X